Kornmannia is a genus of green algae in the family Kornmanniaceae.

The genus name of Kornmannia is in honour of Peter Kornmann (1907-1993), who was a German botanist (Algology), who worked in the Biological Station on Helgoland.

The genus was circumscribed by Carl Vilhelm Bliding in Bot. Not. vol.121 on pages 610-615 in 1969.

References

External links

Ulvophyceae genera
Ulvales